The Reavers are a team of criminal cyborgs appearing in American comic books published by Marvel Comics. The most significant team of Reavers were dedicated to the destruction of the mutant X-Men, and a number of them especially wanted to take revenge on Wolverine in particular. The name Reavers was originally used by a gang of Australian cyborgs. The name later referred to a group under the leadership of Donald Pierce, consisting of the three survivors from the original Reavers along with other cyborgs.

The aforementioned Reavers are different from the Reavers of the planet Arcturus IV, who exist in the future of the alternate reality Earth-691 and are involved in the histories of the Guardians of the Galaxy members Starhawk and Aleta.

The Reavers appeared in the 2017 film Logan with their leader Donald Pierce portrayed by Boyd Holbrook.

Publication history
The Reavers first appeared in Uncanny X-Men #229 and was created by Chris Claremont and Marc Silvestri.

Fictional group history

Looters
The first group of cyborgs calling themselves the Reavers operated out of an underground complex beneath the ghost town of Cooterman's Creek in North Central Australia. The Reavers acted as a commando-style team of thieves, with apparently dozens of members. Their base was inexplicably equipped with advanced computers and a sub-basement and tunnel system. The Reavers coerced the mutant teleporter Gateway to teleport them from Australia to locations around the world to conduct their robberies. Informed of the Reavers' existence by Roma, the X-Men defeat the Reavers in battle and expel them from their base, which they then co-opt for their own use. The X-Men destroy some of the Reavers and force most of the rest to enter the mystical Siege Perilous to meet unrevealed fates. Only Pretty Boy, Skullbuster, and Bonebreaker escape.

Donald Pierce's Reavers
The Reavers are reassembled under the leadership of Donald Pierce, who reorganizes the team as an assassination squadron to undertake para-military style commando operations, dedicated to taking vengeance on the X-Men in particular and eliminating mutants in general. Pierce combines the three survivors of the original Reavers with Lady Deathstrike and the three former Hellfire Club mercenaries Cole, Macon, and Reese. No explanation is given for why Pretty Boy, Skullbuster, and Bonebreaker came to be involved with the group, aside from Pierce claiming to have created the original Reavers. Lady Deathstrike's reasons for joining the Reavers are even more unclear, as she professes a lack of interest in their goal of eliminating mutants.

While the X-Men are away from their Australian base, the Reavers retake the ghost town and wait for the team to come back. However, on their return, the X-Men escape the Reavers through the Siege Perilous. Only Wolverine, who is on a leave of absence in Madripoor, remains. Once he returns, they capture him, and proceed to torture and crucify him. Wolverine escapes the Reavers with the aid of Jubilee. The Reavers then attack the Muir Island Mutant Research Center, theorizing that it is Wolverine's most likely destination. They fight Freedom Force and Moira MacTaggart's alternate X-Men team, and kill Stonewall and Sunder. During the assault on Muir Island, Skullbuster is rendered inoperative by sniper fire from Forge. Donald Pierce rescues a gravely wounded pilot named Cylla Markham, who agrees to be converted into a cyborg.

Around this time, Bonebreaker, Reese, and Pretty Boy are dispatched to a New York warehouse after Microchip, an associate of the Punisher, in a self-confessed mistake, infiltrates their computer system. The temporary absence of Gateway gives Punisher and Microchip enough time to evacuate and set up resistance. The warehouse is destroyed, but the two escape through the sewer. The Reavers face off against the Punisher again. In the firefight, the Reavers kill Microchip's cousin. The Punisher sets off auto-destruct charges, which cause heavy damage to the three Reavers, particularly Bonebreaker, whose cybernetic lower body is demolished. The Reavers retreat.

The Reavers then successfully attack the White Queen's company, Frost Technotics. They capture Rogue, who has returned from inside the Siege Perilous, although Rogue is then rescued by a recreation of Ms. Marvel. Donald Pierce transforms Cylla Markham into the new Skullbuster (although she usually goes by the name Cylla). Lady Deathstrike later seeks Wolverine in Madripoor and Vancouver. Pierce creates an android named Elsie-Dee and a Wolverine android double named "Albert" to kill Wolverine. The attempt fails, however, when Elsie-Dee rebels against her programming.

Upstarts and humans
As part of the Upstarts' game, Trevor Fitzroy dispatches his own Sentinels to the Reavers' Australian hideout to kill Pierce and anyone else they find there. In the ensuing battle, only Pierce, Lady Deathstrike and Cylla escape the massacre, Pierce seemingly only making it as far as the Hellfire Club before he is "killed". Cylla later resurfaces, allying herself with Bloodscream in an attempt to murder Wolverine. However, Bloodscream betrays her and sucks the life from her, killing her.

However, most Reavers somehow survive their supposed deaths. They later return to battle the X-Treme X-Men on behalf of the Shadow King.

Donald Pierce puts together a new group of Reavers, composed of young anti-mutant humans (with the exception of Elixir, who at the time was unaware that he was a mutant). They are defeated by Karma, Elixir, and a handful of young mutants. The group later breaks Pierce out of prison, but with Elixir as bait, they are lured into an ambush and captured by the same five mutants who stopped Pierce when he first betrayed the Hellfire Club's Inner Circle.

Messiah Complex

The Reavers return to play a role in the Messiah Complex event, under the leadership of Lady Deathstrike. Judging from the design of their costumes, as well as their rhetoric in battle, these newest Reavers are simply existing members of the Purifiers upgraded with cybernetics rather than classic members of the team. Deployed as an elite commando unit designed to eliminate organized mutant resistance, the Reavers manage to track down and confront Cable in Alberta, Canada before being attacked by the new X-Force.

In the ensuing battle, Deathstrike and the Reavers are all terminated by Wolverine's strike team, but not before killing the mutant Caliban and injuring Cable. To this date only Deathstrike's fate was revealed, and it remains to be seen whether the Purifiers will be able to upgrade more of their fighters with Reaver technology to replace the ones lost in Canada.

Cable and X-Force
The Reavers play a small role in Cable and X-Force - Volume 4. Pretty Boy, Bonebreaker, Skullbuster (female), and Skullbuster (male) are quickly dispatched by Hope Summers and Cable before being able to deploy an ICBM.

Hunt for Wolverine
During the "Hunt for Wolverine" storyline, Donald Pierce later leads a new group of Reavers, composed of Star and Shine whom together go by the Starshine moniker, Pretty Boy, Skullbuster (Cylla Markham) and Bonebreaker. They were able to find the place where the X-Men had hidden Wolverine's metal-encased body until they were found by an X-Men. During the battle, Wolverine's adamantium shell was broken and to the Reavers surprise it was empty. The X-Men eventually defeated the Reavers and delivered them to Alpha Flight. Only Starshine was able to evade capture and contacted Lady Deathstrike about their findings.

Operating in Madripoor
During the "Iron Man 2020" event, Donald Pierce and the Reavers are shown to have established a company called Reavers Universal Robotics in Hightown, Madripoor. Albert shows up there to confront Donald Pierce where he is confronted by Bonebreaker and the Reavers. Pierce arrives to prevent the lobby from being wrecked. Taking Albert on a tour, Pierce states that he has been upgrading his operations with the help of a 3D Printer. When Pierce stated that Elsie-Dee is not here and that she previously appeared asking to have her self-destruct mechanism disarmed, Albert retaliates while claiming that Pierce doesn't own him or Elsie Dee. After Albert subdues the Reavers, Pierce states that he sold Elsie-Dee's head to yakuza boss Kimura, the arms to the Jade Dragon Triad, and the legs to the Vladivostok Mafia. In light of Albert's actions towards them, the Reavers, Kimura, the Jade Dragon Triad, and the Vladivostok Mafia to take action against Albert vowing that he will never make it out of Madripoor alive.

Known members

First Team
 Bonebreaker
 Skullbuster
 Pretty Boy
 Various unnamed other members (deceased or reincarnated)

Second Team
 Donald Pierce (leader)
 Lady Deathstrike
 Wade Cole (deceased)
 Angelo Macon (deceased)
 Murray Reese (deceased)
 Bonebreaker (arrested)
 Skullbuster
 Skullbuster (Cylla)
 Pretty Boy (arrested)

Third Team
 Donald Pierce (leader)
 Elixir (quit)
 Duncan
 Various unnamed other members

Fourth Team
 Lady Deathstrike (leader)
 Various unnamed other members (all presumed deceased)

Fifth Team
 Donald Pierce (leader)
 Starshine, a duo of Japanese young women that together function as the Reavers ship:
 Star appears to have the ability to fuse with machinery which she can use as her own body 
 Shine appears to possess psionic powers
 Pretty Boy
 Skullbuster (Cylla)
 Bonebreaker
 Lady Deathstrike (defected)

Other versions

Age of Apocalypse
In the Age of Apocalypse, Reavers were a band of human traitors serving Apocalypse. They have been enhanced with Apocalypse's techno-organic virus which allows them to merge with both organic and mechanical materials.

Ultimate Marvel
Rather than being a specific team of supervillains, the Ultimate version of the Reavers are human gladiators who have undergone surgery to become cyborgs for the specific purpose of hunting down mutants on live television for the Genoshan Government under Mojo Adams. They are led by the deranged Mutant-hunter Sgt. Wade "Wadey" Wilson aka Deadpool. Some do retain the names of the Earth-616 Reavers, such as 'Bonebreaker'. Another known one is named 'Cruise'.

In other media

Television
 The Reavers appear in the X-Men: The Animated Series two-part episode "Out of the Past", consisting of Lady Deathstrike, Bonebreaker, Pretty Boy, Murray Reese, Skullbuster, and Wade Cole. Additionally, Donald Pierce appears in the four-part episode "The Dark Phoenix" as a member of the Inner Circle Club.
 The Reavers appear in Wolverine and the X-Men, with vocal effects provided by Charlie Adler in the episode "X-Calibre" and Steve Blum in "Hunting Grounds". This version of the group serves Mojo and consists of Spiral, Murray Reese, Wade Cole, Angelo Macon, and Ricochet, among other unidentified members.

Film
The Reavers appear in Logan, consisting of Donald Pierce, Bonebreaker, Pretty Boy, Angelo Macon, Danny Rhodes, and Mohawk. This version of the group are Alkali-Transigen's enhanced security force who serve the corporation's head, Dr. Zander Rice.

Video games
 The Reavers appear in X-Men as Magneto's soldiers.
 The Reavers appear in The Punisher, with Bonebreaker as a stage boss and several Pretty Boy cyborgs appearing in different stages.
 The Reavers appear in Strider Hiryu's ending in Ultimate Marvel vs. Capcom 3.
 The Reavers appear in Marvel Heroes, with Lady Deathstrike and Bonebreaker as prominent members and Dr. Reaversteins, Mighty Max, Reaver Berserkers, Reaver Blitzkriegs, Reaver Hellhounds, Reaver Maniacs, Reaver Psychotics, and Reaver Savages as foot soldiers.

References

External links
 Reavers at Marvel.com

Characters created by Chris Claremont
Characters created by Marc Silvestri
Marvel Comics cyborgs
Marvel Comics supervillain teams
X-Men supporting characters